Aimee Budge is a British farmer from the Shetland Islands. BBC Countryfile named her a farming hero. She won the Farm Safety Ambassador award from the Scottish Association of Young Farmers Clubs.

She studied at University of Aberdeen.

Her family farm has 90 cattle, 300   sheep and  24 hectares of  barley. The farm was a monitor farm project. She appeared on BBC "This farming life".

She is a member of the Scottish Association of Young Farmers Clubs  Agri and Rural Affairs committee.

References 

21st-century British farmers
Shepherds
Year of birth missing (living people)
Living people
People from Shetland